Fair Warning is the fourth studio album by American rock band Van Halen. Released on April 29, 1981, it sold more than two million copies, but was still the band's slowest-selling album of the David Lee Roth era. Despite the album's commercially disappointing sales, Fair Warning was met with mostly positive reviews from critics.

The album was listed by Esquire as one of the 75 Albums Every Man Should Own.

Packaging
The album's cover artwork features a detail from The Maze, a painting by Canadian artist William Kurelek, which depicts his tortured youth.

The album's cover artwork is accompanied by an insert of a black-and-white portrait of the members of the band, in addition to another black-and-white photo of an exterior wall featuring cracked windows and a lyric from the album's opening song "Mean Street" in handwritten graffiti. This second photo was taken by famed rock photographer Neil Zlozower.

Critical reception

The Village Voice'''s Robert Christgau rated Fair Warning a B−, signifying "a competent or mildly interesting record usually featuring at least three worthwhile cuts." It featured "not just Eddie's latest sound effects, but a few good jokes along with the mean ones and a rhythm section that can handle punk speed emotionally and technically." He also explained "at times Eddie could even be said to play an expressive – lyrical? – role. Of course, what he's expressing is hard to say. Technocracy putting a patina on cynicism".

A retrospective review by AllMusic's Stephen Thomas Erlewine found the album fairly positive. In the review, he initially stated "it's a dark, strange beast, partially because it lacks any song as purely fun as the hits from the first three records" and "whatever the reason, Fair Warning winds up as a dark, dirty, nasty piece of work [...] Dull it is not and Fair Warning contains some of the fiercest, hardest music Van Halen ever made. There's little question Eddie Van Halen won whatever internal skirmishes they had, [...] even with the lack of a single dedicated instrumental showcase."The Rolling Stone Album Guide, however, gave the album two-and-a-half stars out of five, stating that "the most significant musical development is the synthesizer introduced at the end of Fair Warning, which would be exploited to greater effect on later albums."

Track listing

Personnel
Van Halen
David Lee Roth – lead vocals
Eddie Van Halen – guitar, synthesizers, backing vocals
Michael Anthony – bass guitar, backing vocals
Alex Van Halen – drums

Production
 Pete Angelus – cover design
 Chris Bellman – remastering
 Gregg Geller – remastering
 Greg Gorman – photography, inlay photos
 William Kurelek – cover artwork, from The Maze''
 Donn Landee – engineer
 Gene Meros – engineer
 Jo Motta – project coordinator
 Richard Seireeni – art direction
 Ted Templeman – producer
 Neil Zlozower – photography

Charts

Weekly charts

Year-end charts

Certifications

References

Further reading

Van Halen albums
1981 albums
Warner Records albums
Albums produced by Ted Templeman
Albums recorded at Sunset Sound Recorders